Meindert van Buuren, Jr. (born 5 January 1995) is a Dutch former racing driver, who currently resides in Rockanje.

Career

Karting
Van Buuren began karting in 2004 at the age of nine and raced mostly in various Dutch championships, working his way up from the junior ranks to progress through to the Rotax Max DD2 category by 2011, when he finished in fourth position in the Rotax Max Wintercup.

Formula Renault 2.0
2011 saw his début in the Formula Renault 2.0 Northern European Cup championship with Van Amersfoort Racing. Van Buuren finished 21st in the championship, despite missing the final round of the championship, at Monza. He also contested four rounds of the Eurocup Formula Renault 2.0, but only finished one race inside the top twenty placings.

He remained in both series for the 2012 season, but switched to Manor MP Motorsport. He improved to eleventh position in the NEC series, while in the Eurocup, he recorded four top-twenty finishes.

Auto GP
Van Buuren continued his collaboration with Manor MP Motorsport into the Auto GP in 2013. He finished ninth in the drivers' standings with a podium at Donington Park and another nine point-scoring finishes.

Formula Renault 3.5 Series
In 2014, Van Buuren will graduate to the Formula Renault 3.5 Series, joining Pons Racing.

Racing record

Career summary

† As van Buuren was a guest driver, he was ineligible to score points.

Complete Auto GP results
(key) (Races in bold indicate pole position) (Races in italics indicate fastest lap)

Complete Formula Renault 3.5 Series results
(key) (Races in bold indicate pole position) (Races in italics indicate fastest lap)

Complete GP2 Series results
(key) (Races in bold indicate pole position) (Races in italics indicate fastest lap)

References

External links
  
 
 

1995 births
Living people
Dutch racing drivers
Auto GP drivers
Formula Renault Eurocup drivers
World Series Formula V8 3.5 drivers
Formula Renault 2.0 NEC drivers
People from Westvoorne
GP2 Series drivers
Van Amersfoort Racing drivers
MP Motorsport drivers
Manor Motorsport drivers
Pons Racing drivers
Charouz Racing System drivers
Sportspeople from South Holland
KTR drivers
GT4 European Series drivers